Milan Newar (मिलन नेवार) is a popular singer from Nepal. She has been singing since childhood and is able to sing in multiple languages, including Nepali, Hindi, and Assamese. She is currently located in the UK for a music program. In 2014, after six years marriage, she divorced her husband Mason Amatya as he was not supportive of her career. In 2016, Amatya lost over 13 kg and debuted her new figure in a music video which was widely praised by Nepali media outlets. She has written and produced songs for movies and DVDs. Many of her songs have featured her personal pain and family life.

Milan has also participated in a notable Nepali environmental awareness song named Melancholy, which featured 365 Nepali singers and musicians. She recorded her solo parts on 19 May 2016 at Radio Nepal studio in Kathmandu. She set the Guinness World Records for "Most Vocal Solos in a Song Recording.", The song was written, composed and directed by environmentalist Nipesh DHAKA.

Albums
Assamese: Khunmoni (Bihu Songs), Ako Anupama, Kunwali, Rangdhali, Gamusa
Bodo: Rojeni Arnai, Fri Friokha
Nepali: Kanchi, Mero Man, Maya,aya ko Indreni
Rajsthani: Ghoomar,

Awards
Image Awards 2012 (Best Pop Singer Female)

References

1986 births
Living people